is a railway station in the city of Nagano, Japan, operated by the private railway operating company Nagano Electric Railway.

Lines
Yanagihara Station is a station on the Nagano Electric Railway Nagano Line and is 8.0 kilometers from the terminus of the line at Nagano Station, and approximately 23 km from its opposite terminus at Yudanaka Station. From Nagano, soon after departing Yanagihara, the train crosses the Murayama Bridge over the Chikuma River before arriving at Murayama Station in Suzaka, Nagano.

Station layout
The station consists of one ground-level island platform serving two tracks.

Platforms

Adjacent stations

History
The station opened on 28 June 1926.

Passenger statistics
In fiscal 2016, the station was used by an average of 754 passengers daily (boarding passengers only).

Surrounding area

Yanagihara Elementary School
Chikuma River

See also
 List of railway stations in Japan

References

External links
 

Railway stations in Japan opened in 1926
Railway stations in Nagano (city)
Nagano Electric Railway